The Waverly Group is a geologic group in Michigan and Ohio. It preserves fossils dating back to the Carboniferous period.

The groups consists of the following formations:
Bedford Shale
Berea Sandstone
Sunbury Shale
Cuyahoga Formation
Logan Formation
Maxville Limestone

References

Bibliography

External links

 

Geologic groups of Michigan